Andrei Makoveev (born 16 October 1982) is a retired Russian biathlete. His best result at the Biathlon World Championships 2011 was in the sprint, where he placed fourth behind Peiffer, Fourcade and Bø.

References

1982 births
Living people
Russian male biathletes
Universiade medalists in biathlon
Universiade gold medalists for Russia
Competitors at the 2005 Winter Universiade
Competitors at the 2007 Winter Universiade
Tyumen State University alumni
20th-century Russian people
21st-century Russian people